Georg Reismüller, a librarian was from 1929 to 1935 the Director-General of the Bavarian State Library.

Leidinger's dossier 
When the Bavarian Ministry of education informed Georg Leidinger, head of the manuscript department, that Reismüller was chosen to succeed Schnorr von Carolsfeld, he made front against the intruder and had some of his colleagues on his side.
To brush up Reismüller for his new duty, he was sent on a world tour to purchase Chinese books.
From today's point of view very welcome, appeared at the time of the economic crisis as an unnecessary waste of money, the journey itself as a pleasure trip.
It was also permeated that Reismüller's allegiance to the Bavarian State Library and his acquaintance with members of the government might well have had no influence on his calling. Add to that the fact that Reismüller was rather introspective of his kind, so one will understand that he did not have it easy in the library.
 summarized in the Handbuch der Bibliothekswissenschaft [...] and so Schnorr's successor played a party-politically and confessionally colored struggle that reached into the south and north German daily press. Leidinger, scientifically outstanding and fully acquainted with all library facilities over decades of work, was dubbed by the mobile, gifted and linguistic Georg Reismüller; He was made eligible for representation by his political patrons through a one-year library trip that took him across America to China. Unmissed in his focussed professional focus and bound by no tradition, Reismüller 1929–1935 was open-minded to innovations in his manifold interests. It is his great merit to have expanded six spacious book rooms and two top floors to a ten-story modern magazine. He was also enthusiastic about the disclosure of the earlier Bavarian concerns for the connection to the German General Catalog, and he was not uninvolved in the politicization of this enterprise. On the whole he lacked the inclination of a sense for an orderly, rapidly and evenly flowing workflow« (Bd. 3: 2, 1957, 378).
The »völkisch movement« the promises of the National Socialists and the rigorous purgations in the area of personnel came in handy for Reismüller's opponents. No one needed much persuasion to make it clear to the new regime that a Catholic and a member of the People's Party as Director-General was intolerable. The Reichsminister of Science, Education and Culture Bernhard Rust signed the discharge certificate of Reismüller on July 23, 1935 (with effect from August 20). Leidinger, who had used his rival's term to scrutinize his actions and file dossiers on his »mismanagement« and »megalomania« now had an opportunity to present a comprehensive report in which the »atrocities« of Reismüller's revue occurred again:

After Reismüller's release, »the entire staff of the library breathed as if freed from a nasty nightmare.« The Director-General had been offended by his »immoral life, and especially his adulterous activities. Everybody in the library knew about his love affair with Gretl Ullmann, Oberregierungsrat Ludwig Ullmann in Speyer, and niece of the Ministerial Councilor Heinrich Ullmann in Munich, who had moved to Munich. "The criticism was that of »party-political influence« of the Catholic Action.

In this respect, »folkish« oriented librarians felt on the defensive: »The National Socialist-minded officials of the manuscript department continually complain of spying ...
Personal injustices were also denounced: »When he took office, Reismüller took an unprecedented act of revenge against the departmental director, Karl Schottenloher (1878–1954), whom he regarded as a writer of critical newspaper articles.«
Reismüller was accused of incoherence and unprofessional conduct: »At official meetings« Reismüller showed such a general ignorance of science, in particular the necessity of running the State Library itself, that the directors, better established than the Director-General, were compelled to the very conceited Director-General, greatly surpassed by his abilities.
In those sessions, Reismüller was faced hard critic. »He had also sought to obtain departmental informations indirectly. Particularly noteworthy is the »almost unbearable arbitrariness of Reismüller's official orders.« His incompetence had led to the employment of persons »who did not fulfill the conditions for employment and could not enter into any particular relationship with the rest of the civil service.« Unskilled assistants, after a short time, drove the same thing as veteran civil servants.« »Reismuller's often antisocial demeanor, economically depressed subordinates« is presented as a fact, as is the rumor, »that the desk drawer of  has been opened and searched several times with a duplicate key.« [He was supposed to be transferred to Erlangen without his knowledge.]
The fact that the Director-General was working on China of all people might have moved near the ivory tower at other times. However, Leidinger also recognizes the incompetence of his superior. Reismüller was »reputed that he does not understand the Chinese language«. Man ordered him to recatalogue sinica. However, this never brought Reismüller to a standstill. »Sinica's" terrible disorder "is also complained about. »With the help of his party friends, especially Prime Minister Held, he was able to obtain a sum of 20,000 marks in the years 1928–29 for a trip to China and the purchase of Chinese books for the State Library.«
»It's fair to say that this money is thrown out the window. He made the trip with his wife, which made her more than a pleasure trip. And of the books bought in China, which can hardly be called a need of the Munich library, a translucent sinologist has said that a bookseller apprentice in Shanghai could just as well put them together. Moreover, these books are still as they have come to be, disorderly and uncataloged, since of course Reismüller found no time ... «
»Meaningful sinologists have always been reluctant to comment on Reismüller's alleged Chinese knowledge.«
Leidinger reports on the »unbelievable sloppiness until the service offense«,
Recognized by a search of his legacy in the study carried out by the NSDAP shop steward.
»Reismüller's earlier partisan burden, which was not altered by his constant personal contact with the clerical voles of the present, caused obvious damage to the library.«
Gaping contradiction had opened at National Socialist celebrations with their own past.
The Director-General had »no longer any authority,« and the »complete collapse of the external after the Führer's seizure of power« had been evident.
Even the Director-General of the Prussian State Library, Krüss, recognized the Bavarian State Library as a »house of dissatisfaction«. Last but not least, Reismüller ruined the »complete catalog sweep of the Staatsbibliothek« by the »hasty takeover of the Berlin title prints«.
In short, the Bavarian State Library had suffered »infinitely serious damage« from Reismüller.
Leidinger is attested by Georg Leyh (Handbuch der Bibliothekswissenschaft 3.2.1957, 375) »a distinct, idiosyncratic personality«. In connection with the obituary of Paul Ruf (1890–1964)  is added: »For the sake of the truth, however, must not be omitted, that Leidingers despite many honors never satisfied ambition not infrequently exceeded the natural limits.

His literary plans were so numerous and not to be carried out by an individual that he was tempted to block the treasures, manuscripts and old print to be cared for by him for foreign use, even if only his own interests were at stake,
I speak from personal experience.
The most obvious task for him as a historian to write a history of the Munich library, he has touched literarily only fleetingly.
The art historian will not profit from his facsimile editions, which are often inspired by publishers. Munich manuscripts with the accumulation of booklet notes.«
It hardly needs to be explained that Leiderer's report is a dossier of invectives that came from the hurtful ambition of being put back.
However, they can not be tacitly ignored, because otherwise the internal disputes within the Staatsbibliothek and Reismüller's removal from office would hardly be comprehensible.
However, Leidinger has not been able to reap the benefits of his struggle with the Director-General:
New general director was Rudolf Buttmann (1935–1945).
On the other hand, Reismüller was arrested, then came to a sanatorium and died, completely broken, on 12 May 1936 in Günzburg.
It would be hardly surprising if there existed a causal nexus between Reismüller's illness and the treatment by the National Socialists. , who has researched the younger Munich library history, pointed out that this was a temporal coincidence.
What may still have the appearance of a dispute about professional competence and leadership qualities in 1935, acts from the historical distance as a conglomerate of misguided ambition, resentment, and political short-sightedness.
Geldner sums up in his appreciation of Reismüller: »R. was quite a man of the Vita activa; the librarian's long-standing image, that of a "Saint Jerome in His Study (Dürer)", did not correspond to his ideal of life.
The> apostolic impetus <, which he praised in a lecture in 1931 to the then – and present – director of the Stadtbibliothek Munich, impressed him too, led to great successes, but he did not let any danger cautiously avoid him.
A man who had only followed the advice of wisdom would probably have sought and found the opportunity after March, 1933, to withdraw from the danger zone;
R. would have regarded such behavior as cowardice and desertion.
It was necessary, as he once said in conversation, when the resignation of the Minister of Culture at that time became known, "to retain even the last corner of influence and power."
At first, his tactic seemed to be right, he got into a good relationship with the ninth Ministre, and also achieved that funds for the expansion of the northern cross-wing were approved under the new magazine system. This expansion was his greatest success; he was fully successful in the great fire in March 1943 and for a long time formed the most valuable part of the entire library.
New construction of a reading room and further innovations were planned. His sudden arrest in March 1935 put an end to all further plans and career.
He probably did not want to believe that everything was already over, was busy with his Chinese studies in pre-trial detention, but he was retired, although nothing politically stressful could be found, and in the fall of 1935 was already terminally ill Man.

Sinological work 
As a Romanist and Anglist, he was self-taught in Chinese. (At that time, Chinese was not taught at the university) it can be assumed that Reismuller's interest arose either from private inclination or was developed and promoted by his academic teachers, especially Ernst Kuhn and Lucian Scherman.
He explains the transfer process by means of four illustrations, each showing the European original and the Chinese designation, Joseph Needham, the authority in the field of Chinese scientific history, considers Reismüller as a special service, the origin of the Crawler excavators from Besson's factory have proven
The article on the historian and traveler to China, Karl Friedrich Neumann  has a remaining merit, namely to have pointed out the importance of this scholar. On a trip to China in 1830, Neumann succeeded in acquiring Chinese literature of 10,000 copies (probably chüan, actually chapters). Since the Prussian government had given a subsidy, they received a share of the collection, while the Bavarian government bought their share for a professorship, which then queued the lecturers in 1852 because of "democratic machinations. This was the basis for today's East Asian collection of the Bavarian State Library.
The story of the Chinese book collection of the Bavarian State Library has been quoted by Reismüller in a separate essay, to this day
His contribution to the Centenary of the Bavarian State Library is broader and treats the entire Orient. Here Reismüller's own contribution to the proliferation of the collections is modestly raised: "The will of the Bayerische Staatsbibliothek to maintain its great Oriental tradition remained unbroken even after the war, as shown by the recent history of its sinological department. Three years ago, she was able to increase her existing holdings from 12,000 to 30,000 Chinese volumes through the efforts of Georg Reismüller. Almost exactly one hundred years after the trip to China by his sinological predecessor Neumann, he undertook a long study trip to China, Japan and Korea with the support of the Notgemeinschaft der Deutschen Wissenschaft and the Bavarian Prime Minister, and was thus able to implement the program of the scheduled expansion of the Realizing the Sinica Collection. " It is rather a coincidence that we have seen that this is not just a huge increase in quantity,  but rather from the illustration on page 411, where a leaf from the Yung-lo ra-tien is reproduced. Although it is only a facsimile print of 1926 from the manuscript-handed huge encyclopedia of the Ming period, of which originally only 23,000 chapters have received only fractions, but Reismüller has obviously recognized the value and well chosen.

Situation 1933 
In 1933 during the Nazi seizure of power, the Bavarian State Library was headed by Georg Reismüller, born in 1882, after years of life and work, is the youngest among the leading librarians in the house. Heads of department included well-known personalities from the world of librarianship, such as Emil Gratzl (1877–1957), a sovereign in the field of access business, Karl Schottenloher (1878–1954) head of the catalog department.

Publications by Georg Reismüller 

 Romanische Lehnwörter (Erstbelege) bei Lydgate. Inaugural-Dissertation zur Erlangung der Philosophischen Doktorwürde der Philosophischen Fakultät Setion I der Kgl. Ludwigs-Maximilian-Universität München, vorgelegt von Georg Reismüller aus Regensburg am 23. Juli 1909. Naumburg a. S. 1909 Lippert & Co. (G.Pätz'sche Buchdruckerei). 53 S.
 Romanische Lehnwörter (Erstbelege) bei Lydgate. Ein Beitrag zur Lexicographie des Englischen im XV. Jahrhundert. Von Dr. Georg Reismüller. Leipzig: A. Deichert 1911. XII, 134 S. (Münchner Beiträge zur romanischen und englischen Philologie. 48).
 Europäische und chinesische Technik. Von Dr. Georg Reismüller-München. In: Geschichtsblätter für Technik, Industrie und Gewerbe. 1.1914,2-7.
 Karl Friedrich Neumann, Seine Lern- und Wanderjahre, seine chinesischen Büchersammlung. Von Georg Reismüller (München). In: Aufsätze zur Kultur- und Sprachgeschichte, vornehmlich des Orients, Ernst Kuhn zum 70. Geburtstag am 7. Februar 1916 gewidmet, Breslau 1916, 437–457.
 Des baerischen Franziskanerpaters Ladislaus May Reise in das Heiilge Land (1748–1753). Von Dr. Georg Reismüller, Kustos an der Staatsbibliothek München. (Mit 3 Bildern.) In: Das Bayernland. 30.1919, 419–424.
 Zur Geschichte der chinesischen Büchersammlung der Bayerischen Staatsbibliothek. Von Georg Reismüller. In: Ostasiatische Zeitschrift. 8.1919/20, 331–336.
 Auszug aus der Denkschrift des Oberbibliothekars Dr. G. Reismüller über die Schaffung einer Pfälzischen Landesbibliothek, In Die Pfalz am Rhein. 5.1920, 24–28.
 Die neue Pfälzische Landesbibliothek in Speye a. Rh. Referehnt. Bibl.-Dir. Dr. Georg Reismüller, Speyer, In. ZfB 39.1922, 335–340.
 Ausblicke. Vom I. Vorsitzenden des Literarischen Vereins der Pfalz, Dr. Georg Reismüller, Speyer, In: Pfälz, Museum -Pfälz. Museum – Pfälz Heimatkunde. 39.1922, 171.
 Dr. Reismüller: Die neue Pfälzische Landesbibliothek, In: Pfälz. Museum-Pfälz Heimatkunde. 40.1923, 1-8
 Bibliotheksdirektor Dr. Georg Reismüller: Von der neuen Pfälzischen Landesbibliothek. In. Heimaterde. 1.1923, 13–17.
 Planwirtschaft im pfälzischen Bibliothekswesen. Von Dr. G. Reismüller, Direktor der Pfälz. Landesbibliothek. In Pfalzkatalog III, Fa. E. Lincks-Crusius, Kaiserslautern 1924, 41–49.
 Johann Michael Freys wissenschaftlicher Nachlaß in der Pfälzischen Landesbibliothek in Speyer. Von Bibliotheksdirekt. Dr. G. Reismüller, Speyer. In. Neuer Pfälzische Landeszeitung, Beilage Nr. 9 vom 27.9.1924, 7–8.
 Martin Greif Handschriften in der Pfälzischen Landesbibliothek. Von Dr. G. Reismüller. In Palatina-Almanach. 1925. Speyer 1924, 46–50.
 Speyer Büchersammler. Von Dr. G. Reismüller, Direktor der Pfälzischen Landesbibliothek in Speyer. In Das Bayernland. 36.1925, 289–295.
 Pfälzische Büereien in Vergangenheit und Gegenwart. Von Bibliotheksdirektor Dr. Reismüller, Speyer [Quelle nicht erm.] 1925, 70–77.
 Zur Geschichte der pfälzischen Mundarten. Dr. G. Reismüller. In: Pfälz. Museum. 42.1925, 181.
 Die Zeitungsssammlung der Pfälzischen Landesbibliothek. Von Bibl.-Dir. Dr. G. Reismüller, Speyer, In Landauer Anzeiger, Nr. 102, 2.5.1925, 4.
 Herzog Karl August und seine Bibliothek auf dem Karlsberg bei Homburg. Von Bibliotheksdirektor Dr. Reismüller, Speyer. In. Wissernschaft – Volksbildung, Beilage zur Neuen Pfälz. Landeszeitung. Nr. 17–20. 25.10.1925, 14–15.
 Die Pfälzische Landesbibliothek in Speyer von 1. April 1923 bis 1. Sep. 1925, Von Bibliotheksdirektor Dr. Reismüller, In: Pfälz. Museum. 42.1925, 259–261.
 Georg von Neumayers Bibliothek. Von Bibliotheksdirektor Dr. Reismülle. In: Pfälz. Museum, 43.1926, 111.
 Zur Geschichte der naturwissenschaftlichen Bibliotheken in der Pfalz. Von Dr. Reismüller. In: Pfälz, Museum, 44,1927, 9-11.
 Zensur und Zeitung in der Pfalz von hundert Jahren, Vor Dr. Reismüller-Speyer. In: Frankenthaler Tagblatt. 1.10.1927, Nr. 229.
 4 Jahre Pfälzische Lanesbibliothek, in: ZfB 1927, 514
 Zehn Jahre Rheinlandbesetzung. Beschreibendes Verzeichnis des Schrifttums über die Westfragen im Einschluß des Saargebietes und Eupen-Malmedys. Von Dr. Georg Reismüller, Direktor der Pfälzischen Landesbibliothek Speyer und Dr. Josef Hofmann, Bibliothekar der Pfälzischen Landesbibliothek Speyer, Die selbständig erschinenen Schriften. Breslaud: Ferdinand Hirt 1929. XII, 371 S Vorwort, S. V. Gez.: Peking, Ende Januar 1929. Dr. Reismüller, Direktro der Pfälzischen Landesbibliothek.
 Erfahrungen und Eindrücke aus ostasiatischen und amerikanischen Bibliotheken. Referent: Generaldirektor Dr. Georg Reismüller-München. In ZfB 47.1930, 469–473. Auszug aus dem Bericht.
 [Über Leihverkehr.] In: ZFB. 47.1930, 463–465.
 [Über den Gesamtkatalog.] In. ZfB. 47.1930, 505–506.
 Das bayerische Bibliothekswesen in Vergangenheit und Gegenwart. Von Dr. Georg Reismüller, Generaldirektor der Bayerischen Staatsbibliothek. In. Dem bayerischen Volke. 1930, 131–139.
 [Über Hilfsmagazine.] In: ZfB 48.1931, 414–417.
 Brandfackeln in der Pfalz, Josef Pontens neuer Roman »Rhein und Wolga«. Von Dr. Georg Reismüller, Generaldirektor der Bayerischen Staatsbibliothek. In: Münchner Neuste Nachrichten? 345: 19.12.1931.
 Zur Vorgeschichte des Neubaus der Bayerischen Staatsbibliothek. Eine Säkularerinnerung an die Grundsteinlegung am 8. Juli 1832. Von Dr. Georg Reismüller, Generaldirektor der Bayerischen Staatsbibliothek, München. In. Das Bayernland. 43.1932, 387–392.
 Hundert Jahr e Bayerische Staatsbibliothek im Dienste der Wissenschaft vom Orient. Von Generaldirektor Dr. Georg Reismüller, München. In Das Bayernland. 43.1932, 409–414.
 Goethe und die bayerische Gelehrtenpolitik seiner Zeit. Von Generaldirektor Dr. Georg Reismüller, München. In: Das Bayernland. 43.1932, 142–153.
 [Über den Gesamtkatalog.] In.ZfB 50.1933, 589–590.

Secondary literature 
Kürschners Gelehrten-Kalender 5.1935,1098 [ohne Angabe von Publ.].
Geldner, Ferdinand: Dr. Georg Reismüller – ein Lebensbild. In: Ingoldstädter Heimatblätter. 1953, 27–28.
Meier, Franz-Joseph: Aus der Geschichte der Asia Major-Bestände-der Bayer-Staatsbibliothek und ihrer Bearbeitung. In. *Orientalisches aus Münchner Bibliotheken und Sammlungen, München 1957, 39–59, spez 46–48, foto Taf.21.
Schottenloher, Karl: Die Bayern in der Fremde, München Beck 1959, Nr. 757
Bosl's Bayerische Biographie. Ingolstadt 1983, 625.
Ein nur unbedeutender Nachlaßteil Reismüllers is vor einigen Jahren an die Bayerische Staatsbibliothek gelangt. Er gibt aber über die hier behandelten Fragen keine nähere Auskunft.

Press Review 
 On the Change of Directorate General and the Financial Misery of the Bayerische Staatsbibliothek, 1928–1932
 Wie hälts du's mit der Religion? Die Besetzung bayerischer Staatsstellen/R.H. In VZ 453:25.09.1928.
 Ein interessanter Fall. Die Vorgänge in der Bayerischen Staatsbibliothek. In: F 790: 21.10.1928, 2.
 Die Vorgänge in der Bayerischen Staatszeitung. In. Bayer, Kurier 299: 25.10.1928, 3. – Münchern Stadtzeitung. 295: 24.10.1928, 7. – Bayerische Staatszeitung 247: 24.10.1928, 2–3.
 Um die Leitung der Bayerischen Staatsbibliothek: In: Augsburger Postzeitung. 255: 6.11.1928, 5.
 Der Generaldirektorsposten and er Bayerischen Staatsbibliothek, Inn: MNN 304: 7.11.1928, 4.
 Ist es denn wahr? Zum Notstand unserer Staatsbibliothek. Von Karl Wolfskehrl. In MNN? 59:1.3.1929.
 Geist ohne Geld! Ein Hilferuf der Staatsbibliothek. In Süddeutsche Sonntatgspost. 15: 14.4.1929, 10.
 Der Rückgang der Staatsbibliothek. Debatte im Haushaltsausschuß. In Münchner Telegramm Zeigung. 72: 16.4.1929, 1.
 Kulturpolitik in Bayern. III. In: Münchner Post, 102: 3.5.1929, 3.
 Staatsbibliothek und Korporationswesen, In: Bayer. Kurier. 127: 7.5.1929, 3.
 Kulturpolitik in Bayern. In: NZZ 889: 9.5.1929, Bl.4.
 Die Bayerische Staatsbibliothek und die Kunststadt München. In. MNN 132: 16.5.1929, 5.
 Palastrevolution in der Staatsbibliothek. In Bayer Kurier. 141; 21.5.1929, 2.
 Der Kampf um die Staatsbibliothek. Die Hetze des Bayer. Kurier und der Augsburger Postzeitung, In: VB 123:30./315.1929.
 Sonderbare Geschichten aus der Staatsbibliothek, In. Augsburger Postzeitung. 119, 28.5.1929,5.
 Bayerische Gelehrtenarbeit in Ostasien. Dr. Reismüller Bücher Erwerbungen in China und Japan. In. MNN 161: 16.61929, 2 [18500 Bde].
 Ernüchterung. In: Bayer Kurier. 170: 19.6.1929, 3.
 »Skrupelloser Zuträger ...« In Münchner Beobachter (Tägl. Beiblatt zum V.B.). 141: 21.6.1929.
 Wechsel in der Leitung der Staatsbibliothek. In. MNN? 214: 8.8.1929. – Rhein. Volksblatt [Speyer] 183 : 8.8.1929.
 Der neue Generaldirektor der Staatsbibliothek. In Bayer. Kurier. 221: 9.8.1929, 4.
 Generaldirektor der Bayerischen Staatsbibliothek/Dr. E. In: MNN? 215: 9.8.1929.
 Die Leitung der Bayerischen Staatsbibliothek/ – er. In Bayer. Staatszeitung. 184: 11./12.8.1929, 2.
 [foto Reismüller.] In: Süddeutsche Sonntagspost, 32: 11.8.1929, 5.
 Eine Abwehrstelle gegen Dummheit. Die Beratungsstelle der Volksbücherei in München. Dr. Sy. In Münchner SS-Sontags-Anzeiger. 43: 26.10.1930, 3 [Mit Foto Reismüller].
 Nachtgespräch vor der Staatsbibliothek. Eine Parabel/Dr. A. M[einer?] in : Münchner Post. 17: 22.1.1931, 2.
 Ein Wort für die Staatsbibliothek. In. Bayer. Staatszeitung, 50: 1./2. 3. 1931, 4.
 Drahtverhau im Treppenhaus der Staatsbibliothek. In: Münchner Stadt-Anzeiger. 63: 4.3.1931, 5.
 Der Verfall der Staatsbibliothek. Von Joseph Bernhart. In: MNN 90: 3.4.1931.
 Um den guten Ruf der Staatsbibliothek. In. Das Bayerische Vaterland. Nr. 99-102. 1931.
 Dr. Georg Reismüller [50 Jahre]. In: MNN? Nr. 126: 10.5.1932.
 Jahre bayerische Büchereidiesnt. In: Bayer. Staatszeitung. 108: 12.5.1932, 2.
 Im Bergwerk der Bücher. 100 Jahre Staatsbibliothek an der Ludwigstraße Effi Horn. In: Münchner Telegrafen Zeitung. 116: 21./22.5.1932,2.

»Der bekannte China-Forscher ...« in: MNN 310: 14.11.1932, 2.

Abbreviations, Press Review 
F – Frankfurter Zeitung;
MNN – Münchner Neueste Nachrichten
NZZ – Neue Zürcher Zeitung
VB – Völkischer Beobachter
VZ – Vossische Zeitung

Footnotes

References 
Hartmut Walravens, Palastrevolution in der Staatsbibliothek? : die Kontroverse um Generaldirektor Georg Reismüller / In: Bibliotheksforum Bayern. – München. 26 (1998),3, pages 256 to 270.

1882 births
1936 deaths
German librarians
People from Ingolstadt